Anchytarsus is a genus of toe-winged beetles in the family Ptilodactylidae. There are at least two described species in Anchytarsus.

Species
These two species belong to the genus Anchytarsus:
 Anchytarsus bicolor (Melsheimer, 1846)
 Anchytarsus folliculipalpus

References

Further reading

 

Byrrhoidea
Articles created by Qbugbot